The 1973 Point Mugu earthquake occurred at  on February 21 in the Point Mugu area of southeastern Ventura County of southern California. It had a moment magnitude of 5.8 and a maximum Mercalli Intensity of VII (Very strong). This oblique-slip shock resulted in several injuries and $1 million in damage. The epicenter was near the Oxnard Plain and the northern terminus of the Santa Monica Mountains, in the California South Coast region.

Intensity
At the most extreme points of its perceptibility along the coast, it was felt between intensity I and III (Not felt – Weak) at San Luis Obispo in the north and San Diego in the south. Inland, it was felt at McFarland in the central valley and Cantil in the western Mojave Desert, and to the southeast in Palm Springs.

See also
 
 List of earthquakes in 1973
 List of earthquakes in California
 Point Mugu State Park

References

External links

Point Mugu earthquake
Earthquakes in California
Point Mugu earthquake
Point Mugu earthquake
Point Mugu earthquake
Point Mugu earthquake
Point Mugu earthquake
Point Mugu earthquake